

Overview
Only one official league existed at the time.  It was called Coupe de Championnat (Championship Cup) and was disputed between 7 teams.

Honour

League standings

External links
RSSSF archive - Final tables 1895-2002
Belgian clubs history

 
Seasons in Belgian football
Belgian